Sahand Airport  is an airport in Maragheh, Iran.

Airlines and destinations

References

Airports in Iran
Buildings and structures in East Azerbaijan Province
Transportation in East Azerbaijan Province